Adja Marieme Diop (born 5 August 1977) is a Senegalese judoka. She competed in the women's heavyweight event at the 2000 Summer Olympics.

References

External links 
 
 
 

1977 births
Living people
Senegalese female judoka
Olympic judoka of Senegal
Judoka at the 2000 Summer Olympics
Place of birth missing (living people)
African Games medalists in judo
African Games bronze medalists for Senegal
Competitors at the 1995 All-Africa Games